Profetamine is the name of a generic form of amphetamine sulfate which was introduced in the 1940s. Apparently, it was a counterfeit of the patented SKF Benzedrine Sulfate tablets that were available at the time.

See also
Gordon Alles
Benzedrine
Amphetamine

References

Substituted amphetamines